Nauzet Alemán Viera (born 25 February 1985), known simply as Nauzet, is a Spanish retired footballer who played mainly as a right midfielder.

He spent most of his career with Las Palmas, playing 273 competitive games and scoring 40 goals. In La Liga, he also represented Valladolid.

Club career
Born in Las Palmas, Canary Islands, Nauzet made his debuts with hometown's UD Las Palmas during 2003–04's second division, playing ten games for an eventual relegation. He subsequently became an automatic first-choice.

In the 2005–06 season, Nauzet was instrumental as his team once again returned to the second level: in the last minutes of a match at Real Sociedad B, in the first round of the promotion play-offs, he scored a goal which would relegate the Basques. Additionally, in the decisive contest against CD Linares, he set up Marcos Márquez for the game's only goal.

In late June 2009, not having renewed his contract with Las Palmas, Nauzet signed for La Liga club Real Valladolid, penning a three-year deal. He made his league debut on 30 August as a starter at UD Almería, being sacrificed in the 15th minute of the game after defender Nivaldo was sent off (eventual 0–0 draw); he then proceeded to net four times in the next six matches, including twice against Deportivo de La Coruña on 25 October (4–0 home win), but the Castile and León side was eventually relegated at the season's end.

On 8 September 2011, Nauzet scored four goals against Gimnàstic de Tarragona for the campaign's Copa del Rey, in a 6–0 home win. In February 2016, after being assaulted in a nightclub, he was separated from the first team squad for 15 days.

On 7 July 2016, Nauzet terminated his contract with Las Palmas. On 13 August 2017, after a year without a club, he joined Almería in the second division, but left at his own request on 12 December.

On 1 January 2018, Nauzet announced his retirement at the age of 32.

References

External links

1985 births
Living people
Footballers from Las Palmas
Spanish footballers
Association football midfielders
La Liga players
Segunda División players
Segunda División B players
UD Las Palmas Atlético players
UD Las Palmas players
Real Valladolid players
UD Almería players
Spain youth international footballers